Fritz Stange (20 September 1936 – 4 August 2013) was a German wrestler. He competed at the 1960 Summer Olympics, the 1964 Summer Olympics and the 1968 Summer Olympics.

References

External links
 

1936 births
2013 deaths
German male sport wrestlers
Olympic wrestlers of the United Team of Germany
Olympic wrestlers of West Germany
Wrestlers at the 1960 Summer Olympics
Wrestlers at the 1964 Summer Olympics
Wrestlers at the 1968 Summer Olympics
People from Ludwigsburg
Sportspeople from Stuttgart (region)
21st-century German people
20th-century German people